New Jersey American Water is the largest water utility in the U.S. State of New Jersey, serving around two and a half million people in 183 communities in 17 counties throughout the state, supplying potable water and wastewater service. Headquartered in Voorhees, New Jersey, New Jersey American Water is a wholly owned subsidiary of the for-profit American Water.

Water Quality
The company detected an unregulated chemical, 1,4-Dioxane, in the Delaware River, the water supply for their drinking water treatment plant in Delran, New Jersey. The company helped discover the source upstream.

See also
Union Watersphere
United Water

References

External links
New Jersey American Water Home Page

Voorhees Township, New Jersey
Companies based in Camden County, New Jersey
Water companies of the United States

de:American Water Works Company